The 1996–97 season was the 51st season in Rijeka's history. It was their 6th season in the Prva HNL and 23rd successive top tier season.

Competitions

Prva HNL

Classification

Results summary

Results by round

Matches

Prva HNL

Source: HRnogomet.com

Croatian Cup

Source: HRnogomet.com

Squad statistics
Competitive matches only.  Appearances in brackets indicate numbers of times the player came on as a substitute.

See also
1996–97 Prva HNL
1996–97 Croatian Cup

References

External sources
 1996–97 Prva HNL at HRnogomet.com
 1996–97 Croatian Cup at HRnogomet.com 
 Prvenstvo 1996.-97. at nk-rijeka.hr

HNK Rijeka seasons
Rijeka